Abu al-Wafa Ali Ibn Aqil ibn Ahmad al-Baghdadi (1040–1119) was an Islamic theologian from Baghdad, Iraq. He was trained in the tenets of the Hanbali school (madhab) for eleven years under scholars such as the Qadi Abu Ya'la. Despite this, Ibn Aqil was forced into hiding by the Hanbalis for frequenting the circles of groups who were at odds with the Hanbali tradition. In one of his reminiscences, he remarks that his Hanbali companions wanted him to abandon the company of certain scholars, and complains that it hindered him from acquiring useful knowledge.

Ibn ‘Aqil studied with Hanbalis, Hanafis, Shafi‘is, Mu‘tazilis, and Sufis, and was described by Taqi al-Din Ibn Taymiyya as more knowledgeable than Abu Hamid al-Ghazali. 

His early teachers included three women scholars: al-Huraniyya, Bint al-Junayyid, and Bint al-Gharrad.

Ibn ‘Aqil had completed five years of undergraduate study and seven years of graduate study in law, but at that time, for a candidate to qualify for a professorial position in law, one normally needed fifteen years of graduate level study in jurisprudence. Ibn ‘Aqil, despite being younger than all the other professorial candidates, was selected to occupy the professorial chair at the Mosque of the Caliph al-Mansur, and with this, Ibn ‘Aqil became the head of the Hanbali school in Baghdad.

Creed 
Ibn 'Aqil leaned strongly toward Ash'arism; he had signed, around 455, the fatwa protesting against its persecution, and it was he who, in 476, performed the ablutions on the body of his friend, Abu Ishaq al-Shirazi, the Ash'arite rector of the Nizamiyya. His forced retraction represents one episode in the struggle carried on by conservative Hanbalites against Ash'arite Shafi'ites, who got back at them five years later when Abu Ishaq al-Shirazi succeeded in getting Abu Ja'far ibn Abi Musa arrested.

Works 
Among his works of jurisprudence that have survived are Wadih fi usul al-fiqh and (in part) Kitab al-funun, a huge collection of anecdotes about the attitudes and customs of his times, in one hundred volumes. In it he writes:

Truly, it is not lawful for me to waste a single moment of my life; so that when my tongue is not engaged in instructive conversation and disputation, or my sight in studying, I engage my mind in meditation in my moments of rest, lying down, only to rise with some thought having occurred to me which I then commit to paper. In the eighth decade of my life, I do indeed experience a zeal for learning more intense than that experienced when I was a young man of twenty.

See also 
 Abu Mansur ibn Yusuf: Ibn Aqil's patron during his earlier years
 Ibn al-Jawzi
 List of Ash'aris and Maturidis

Notes

Asharis
Hanbalis
12th-century Muslim theologians
Sunni imams
Sunni Muslim scholars of Islam
Ibn Aqil
11th-century Muslim theologians
11th-century people from the Abbasid Caliphate
11th century in Iraq
Ibn Aqil
Ibn Aqil